Proteuxoa is a genus of moths of the family Noctuidae. The genus was erected by George Hampson in 1903.

Species

References

 
Noctuinae
Noctuoidea genera